The Trans-Mississippi Amateur or Trans-Miss Amateur is an annual amateur golf tournament. It is organized by the Trans-Mississippi Golf Association and was first played in 1901. It is played at a different course each year that are located near or west of the Mississippi River. From 1987 to 2009, the field has been limited to mid-amateurs (age 25 or greater). From its inception through the 2009 event, it was played in two parts, a 36-hole stroke play competition to determine a 64 player field for the match play competition. Beginning in 2010, it is a 54-hole stroke play tournament, with no age restrictions on entries.

In December 2021, the Trans-Mississippi Amateur joined with six other tournaments to form the Elite Amateur Golf Series.

Winners

References

External links
Trans-Mississippi Golf Association
List of winners

Amateur golf tournaments in the United States
Recurring sporting events established in 1901
1901 establishments in Missouri